In Ireland, the October Holiday (sometimes called the October Bank Holiday,  or Lá Saoire Oíche Shamhna) is observed on the last Monday of October. Usually, but not always, this is the day after the end of Western European Summer Time. It was introduced in 1977.

See also
Bank holiday

References

Public holidays in the Republic of Ireland
Monday observances
October observances
Holidays and observances by scheduling (nth weekday of the month)